A calcium channel is an ion channel which shows selective permeability to calcium ions. It is sometimes synonymous with voltage-gated calcium channel, although there are also ligand-gated calcium channels.

Comparison tables
The following tables explain gating, gene, location and function of different types of calcium channels, both voltage and ligand-gated.

Voltage-gated

Ligand-gated
the receptor-operated calcium channels (in vasoconstriction)
P2X receptors

Pharmacology

L-type calcium channel blockers are used to treat hypertension. In most areas of the body, depolarization is mediated by sodium influx into a cell; changing the calcium permeability has little effect on action potentials. However, in many smooth muscle tissues, depolarization is mediated primarily by calcium influx into the cell. L-type calcium channel blockers selectively inhibit these action potentials in smooth muscle which leads to dilation of blood vessels; this in turn corrects hypertension.

T-type calcium channel blockers are used to treat epilepsy. Increased calcium conductance in the neurons leads to increased depolarization and excitability. This leads to a greater predisposition to epileptic episodes. Calcium channel blockers reduce the neuronal calcium conductance and reduce the likelihood of experiencing epileptic attacks.

See also 

 .

References

External links 
 
 
 
 

Ion channels
Electrophysiology
Integral membrane proteins
Calcium channels